Faith deconstruction, also known as deconstructing faith, evangelical deconstruction, the deconstruction movement, or simply deconstruction, is a Christian phenomenon where people unpack, rethink and examine their belief systems. This may lead to dropping one's faith all together or may result in a stronger faith. There is no end goal for deconstruction. David Hayward coined the term for the process he was experiencing when leaving the church. The word is adapted from the writing of Jacques Derrida.  It is closely related to the exvangelical movement.

Description

The term can have a range of meanings. Alisa Childers defines deconstruction as "the process of systematically dissecting and often rejecting the beliefs you grew up with." Tyler Huckabee, writing for Relevant  magazine, defines it as "a process of re-examining the faith you grew up with." John Stonestreet and Timothy Padgett note that it is used both descriptively (covering everything from the deconversion of Kevin Max, through the soul searching of Derek Webb, to the theological revisions of Jen Hatmaker and Rob Bell), or prescriptively ("recommended, especially to those questioning what they’ve grown up with, as a courageous thing to do").

There is broad agreement that the term is derived from Jacques Derrida's philosophical concept of deconstruction. 

Notable advocates of faith deconstruction include internet comedy duo Rhett McLaughlin and Link Neal (who published multiple podcast episodes detailing their spiritual deconstruction), John D. Caputo (who in 2007 wrote What Would Jesus Deconstruct?: The Good News of Postmodernism for the Church), and Richard Rohr. Prominent former Christians who underwent deconstruction include Joshua Harris (who briefly offered a course on deconstruction), Abraham Piper, and Marty Sampson.

As of February 2022 there were 293,026 posts on Instagram utilizing the hashtag #deconstruction.

Responses

After preaching a sermon in which he equated deconstruction with leaving the faith, Matt Chandler clarified that it "doesn’t mean doubt or theological wrestle or struggling through church hurt." John Cooper has stated, "It is time that we declare war against this deconstruction Christian movement... There is nothing Christian about it. It is a false religion."

On the other hand, Tyler Huckabee argues that it can result in "deconversion", or "in your faith looking more or less the same it always did" but "most often, it's somewhere in between—rethinking the things you’ve always believed and coming to a new, different understanding of parts of it." Huckabee goes on to suggest that Martin Luther's own theological revolution "fits into the paradigm of what researchers would call deconstruction today."

Criticism of the term
Carl Trueman, argues that the "(mis)use of the Derridean d-word gives the whole a specious veneer of intellectualism and a certain superannuated postmodern chic."

See also

References

Further reading

Evangelicalism in the United States
Christian terminology
Faith in Christianity
Deconstruction